La Paz Aeroclub is a public use airport located  east of La Paz, a town on the Paraná River in Entre Ríos Province, Argentina.

See also

Transport in Argentina
List of airports in Argentina

References

External links 
OpenStreetMap - La Paz Aeroclub
OurAirports - La Paz Airport
FallingRain - La Paz Aeroclub

Airports in Argentina
Entre Ríos Province